The Invincible Brothers Maciste is a 1964 Italian peplum film written and directed  by Roberto Mauri.

Plot

Two Herculean warrior brothers battle to save their prince from the clutches of an evil queen, in a hidden world lurking behind a giant waterfall. The depraved queen practices mind-control and must force her slave population to continually turn a waterwheel lest their world come to an end.

Cast

 Richard Lloyd as Maciste The Old
 Claudie Lange as  Queen Thaliade 
 Tony Freeman as Maciste The Young  
 Anthony Steffen as  Prince Akim  
 Ursula Davis as Jana 
 Gia Sandri as  Nice

Release
The Invincible Brothers Maciste was released theatrically in Italy on 18 December 1964. On its release in the United States, the film had a different running time of 92 minutes.

References

Bibliography

External links

The Invincible Brothers Maciste at Variety Distribution

1960s fantasy adventure films
Italian fantasy adventure films
Peplum films
Maciste films
Films directed by Roberto Mauri
Sword and sandal films
Films with screenplays by Edoardo Mulargia
1960s Italian films